The Sting Variations is an album by The Tierney Sutton Band. It earned the group a Grammy Award nomination for Best Jazz Vocal Album.

Track listing

Personnel
 Tierney Sutton – vocals
 Christian Jacob – piano
 Ray Brinker – drums, percussion
 Kevin Axt – double bass
 Trey Henry – double bass, bass guitar, arranger, producer
 Zackary Darling – engineer, mixing
 Michael Aarvold– mastering, mixing

References

2016 albums
Tierney Sutton albums